The Austro-Hungarian Tenth Army was an Austro-Hungarian field army that fought during World War I.

Actions 
The Tenth Army was formed in February 1916 on the Italian Front, where it remained active until the end of the War. 
It participated in the 
 Battle of Caporetto (October - November 1917)
 Battle of the Piave River (June 1918)
 Battle of Vittorio Veneto (October–November 1918)

Commanders
 Franz Rohr von Denta : February 1916 - 18 June 1916 
 Karl Scotti : 18 June 1916 - April 1917 
 Alexander von Krobatin : April 1917 - 3 November 1918

Sources 

 Austro-Hungarian Army, Higher Commands and Commanders

Field armies of Austria-Hungary
1916 establishments in Austria-Hungary
Military units and formations established in 1916
Military units and formations disestablished in 1918